Günbağı is a village in the Erzincan District, Erzincan Province, Turkey. The village is populated by Kurds of the Aşuran and Lolan tribes and had a population of 325 in 2021. The hamlet of Uğurlu is attached to the village.

References 

Villages in Erzincan District
Kurdish settlements in Erzincan Province